Senate elections were held in the Czech Republic on 10–11 October 2014, with a second round on 17–18 October 2014. One-third of Senate seats (27 out of 81) were elected, along with approximately 62,300 local council seats. The election date was announced by the President Miloš Zeman in June, 2014.

Results

References

External links
2014 Czech Senate election (Senate of the Parliament of the Czech Republic) 

 
Senate elections in the Czech Republic
Czech Republic
Senate
Czech